Patricia Halliday (9 March 1930 - 14 April 2019) was an English botanist and Illustrator who worked at Kew Gardens.

Biography 
Patricia Halliday was born in East Sheen, Richmond. She started working as Assistant Scientific Office at the Herbarium, Kew Gardens in 1947, promoted to Higher Scientific Officer in 1985. She worked as a taxonomist with special interest in the Compositae and the genus Kleinia, as well as botanical illustration; she retired in 1990.

For her illustrations the Royal Horticultural Society awarded her the Grenfell Bronze Medal (1989), the Grenfell Silver-gilt Medal (1990, 1993), and the Lindley Silver-gilt Medal (1991). Her work is represented in the Hunt Botanical Library.

She also wrote humorous verse.

She died in East Sheen in 2019.

Kleinia patriciae C.Jeffrey is named for her.

Selected publications 

 Snaily Verse (1972). Pat Halliday. The Marsland Press.
 Sea-Snaily Verse et cetera (1981). Pat Halliday. The Marsland Press.
 Myrsinaceae (1984). P. Halliday. Flora of Tropical East Africa. ISBN ‎ 9789061913108
 The genus Kleinia (Compositae) in Arabia. (1984). P. Halliday. Kew Bulletin 39(4) 817-827 
 Noteworthy Species of Kleinia (1988). P. Halliday. Hooker's Icones Plantarum 39(4). Bentham-Moxon Trust. ISBN‎ 9780950487663
 The Illustrated Rhododendron: Their Classification Portrayed Through the Artwork of Curtis's Botanical Magazine. (2001). Pat Halliday. Timber Press. ISBN‎ 9780881925104

References 

1930 births
2019 deaths
British women botanists
Botanists active in Kew Gardens
People from East Sheen
20th-century English poets